Nikita Mikhailovich Tregubov (born 14 February 1995) is a Russian skeleton racer.

Career
He competed at the 2014 Winter Olympics in his native Russia, and when improved to a silver medal in skeleton at the 2018 Winter Olympics in Korea. During the Games, Tregubov remarked that US and British athletes are "set against us politically."

Tregubov qualified for the 2022 Winter Olympics in Beijing, but was withdrawn after a positive COVID-19 test.

World Cup results
All results are sourced from the International Bobsleigh and Skeleton Federation (IBSF).

References

External links

1995 births
Living people
Olympic skeleton racers of Russia
Russian male skeleton racers
Skeleton racers at the 2014 Winter Olympics
Skeleton racers at the 2018 Winter Olympics
Sportspeople from Krasnoyarsk
Medalists at the 2018 Winter Olympics
Olympic medalists in skeleton
Olympic silver medalists for Olympic Athletes from Russia
20th-century Russian people
21st-century Russian people